The Ața is a left tributary of the river Tarcău in Romania. It discharges into the Tarcău near Brateș.

References

Rivers of Romania
Rivers of Neamț County